Cumberland College is a regional college based in Melfort, Nipawin and Tisdale, Saskatchewan that provides post-secondary education in the north east region of the province.

History and Governance 
Cumberland College was founded as Cumberland Community College by the Province of Saskatchewan in 1974, with the first slate of courses being offered in the fall of 1975. It was renamed Cumberland Regional College in 1988 to coincide with a new mandate under the Regional Colleges Act (1986) and an increased regional reach. Around 2008 the College attained its current name. The College primarily serves the education and training needs of communities and industry partners in northeast Saskatchewan.

The College is in a Coalition with Parkland College (Saskatchewan), which is located in east central Saskatchewan. The Coalition shares a President and CEO and is focused on improving operational efficiencies (resource use) and enhancing organization effectiveness (impact). Each of the two colleges has its own Board of six Governors, but the same six Governors sit on each Board.

Programs
Cumberland College provides academic upgrading, college certificate and diploma, and university programs in a variety of fields and trades. The college provides career counselling to students and other support services to help them be successful.

ABE training enables students to obtain a Grade-12 equivalent certificate, which facilitates transition to either post-secondary education or employment. Work essential skills are needed for success in work, learning and life; they are the foundational skills that make it easier to learn all other skills.

College programs are brokered from institutions such as Saskatchewan Polytechnic and Lakeland College, Alberta. Select university programs are offered at the undergraduate and graduate level in partnership with the University of Saskatchewan and University of Regina.

The college has a robust continuing education program that provides first aid, safety and corporate training to individuals and organizations in its region.

The college has strong ties with Indigenous learners and communities such as Yellow Quill First Nation and Shoal Lake Cree Nation.

Campuses 
Cumberland College serves its region through campuses located in Melfort, Nipawin and Tisdale. Additionally, programs are offered in partnership with our Indigenous communities, including the James Smith Cree Nation, Muskoday First Nation and Red Earth First Nation.

See also
Higher education in Saskatchewan
List of agricultural universities and colleges
List of colleges in Canada#Saskatchewan

References

External links
Cumberland College

Colleges in Saskatchewan
Educational institutions established in 1974
Vocational education in Canada
1974 establishments in Saskatchewan